Bernegg Castle is a castle in the Swiss Canton of Thurgau in the village of Emmishofen, which is part of the municipality of Kreuzlingen.

See also
 List of castles in Switzerland

References

Castles in Thurgau